EUREX (Enriched Uranium Extraction) was a pilot nuclear fuel reprocessing facility built in 1965 by ENEA in Northern Italy. It ceased operation in 1984. It is located near the town of Saluggia on the Saluggia-Crescentino road.
Since 2003, the Italian nuclear waste company SOGIN took control to dismantle the old plant.

Environmental remediation of the site is expected to finish in 2029.

References

Nuclear reprocessing sites
Nuclear technology in Italy
Nuclear power in Italy